Saint-Michel-de-Bellechasse is a municipality of about 1,800 people about 20 km east of Lévis, in Bellechasse Regional County Municipality in the Chaudière-Appalaches region of Quebec, Canada. It is a mostly rural community, and it was chosen as one of the Most Beautiful Villages of Quebec in Quebec. Route 281 passes through it.

See also
 Saint-Michel

References

Municipalities in Quebec
Incorporated places in Chaudière-Appalaches